Jason Marshall (born 20 June 1996) is an English cricketer. He made his first-class debut on 28 March 2017 for Durham MCCU against Gloucestershire as part of the Marylebone Cricket Club University fixtures.

References

External links
 

1996 births
Living people
English cricketers
Durham MCCU cricketers
Cricketers from Greater London